Norman Coke-Jephcott FRCO FAGO, FRCCO, FTCL (17 March 1893 – 14 March 1962) was an English composer and organist based both  in his native England and the United States of America.

Life

Norman Coke-Jephcott was born in Coventry on 17 March 1893. He was educated at Bablake School.

He was awarded his Fellowship of the Royal College of Organists in 1911. He was admitted Fellow of the American Guild of Organists (ad eundem) in 1912.

In 1945 he was admitted to the Fellowship in the Canadian College of Organists (honoris causa) and in the same year received the honorary degree of the D. Mus. from Ripon College in the same year.

He was made a Fellow of Trinity College, London in 1947.

Regarded by his colleagues as one of the world's greatest masters in organ improvisation, he had also to his credit over twenty published works.

Appointments

Assistant organist at Holy Trinity Church, Coventry 1909-1911
Organist at Holy Cross Church, Kingston, New York 1911 - 1915
Organist at the Church of the Messiah, Rhineback, New York 1915 - 1923
Organist at Grace Church (Utica, New York) 1923 - 1932
Organist and Master of the Choristers at the Cathedral of St. John the Divine, New York 1932 - 1953

Compositions

His compositions include:
Bishop's Promenade
Surely the Lord is in this Place
Classical Fugue on a subject by Paul Vidal
Fantasie on a National Air
Improvisation on an Irish Air

References

1893 births
1962 deaths
English organists
British male organists
People educated at Bablake School
Fellows of the Royal College of Organists
Musicians from Coventry
English expatriates in the United States
20th-century English composers
20th-century organists
20th-century British male musicians